Luis Otero Cifuentes (Cali September 25, 1943 – Bogotá November 7, 1985) was a Colombian politician and guerrilla fighter. He was killed in the Palace of Justice siege in Bogotá.

Biography
He studied in the Free University of Colombia School and Anthropology in the National University of Colombia. He became a member of the Communist Youth (in Spanish Juventud Comunista, JuCo) and fought in Cuba on the side of Fidel Castro in the Escambray. Back in Colombia, he was one of the founders of the 19th of April Movement (M-19), one of the "Second Wave" groups prioritising urban action with no specific ideological position.

He planned the capture of the Dominican Republic embassy by a M-19 guerrilla squad in 1980, which lasted 61 days. In 1985 he was among the leaders of the Palace of Justice siege, where he died together with other guerrillas and hostages during the recapture of the building by the Army. His corpse was never found.

See also
 Andrés Almarales
 Alfonso Jacquin

References

Bibliography 

 

 

1946 births
Free University of Colombia alumni
1985 deaths
19th of April Movement members
Colombian guerrillas killed in action